Tepic is the capital and largest city of the western Mexican state of Nayarit, as well as the seat of the Tepic Municipality.

Nearby are the extinct Sangangüey volcano and its crater lake. Tepic is the primary urban center of this rich agricultural region; major crops include sugarcane, tobacco and citrus fruits.

The city was founded in 1531 as Villa del Espíritu Santo de la Mayor España.

Population

Indigenous population 
Tepic has the second-largest indigenous population in the State of Nayarit, 4,375. The most prominent groups among them are the Huichol or Wixárika (3,276), Cora (527) and Purépecha (101).

Religion 

Catholicism is the most prominent religion in Tepic with 94.2% of the population. Its Catedral de la Purísima Concepción, dedicated to the Immaculate Conception, is the cathedral episcopal see of the Roman Catholic Diocese of Tepic, a suffragan see in the ecclesiastical province of the Archdiocese of Guadalajara.

Notable locals 

 Juan Escutia: Boy hero of the Battle of Chapultepec. Born in Tepic, between 1828 and 1832, on the morning of 13 September 1847, he fought to prevent invading U.S. forces from capturing Chapultepec Castle in Mexico City. After a brave defense, he is reported to have wrapped himself in the national flag and leaped to his death.
 Luis E. Miramontes: Chemist, co-inventor of the first contraceptive pill
 Amado Nervo: Poet and diplomat.
 Antonio Rivas Mercado.
 Emilia Ortiz: Contemporary painter, caricaturist and poet, after whom the major downtown Centro de Arte Contemporaneo Emilia Ortiz has been named.
 Gustavo Ayón: NBA basketball player
 Francisco Guerrero: Mayor of San Francisco, 1836-1842.
 Luis Ernesto Franco: Mexican actor.
 Joaquín Cosío: Mexican actor. 
 Manuel Lozada.

Sports 
Nayarit had small stadiums built for football and baseball. Both now demolished, there are plans to construct new, modern, and bigger stadiums; the state has three sport private clubs. There are multiple football fields and places to play "cascaritas" (pick-up games), indoor football courts, a basketball center and gym (with wooden flooring), several volleyball courts, and a bowling alley. In addition to common sports, in the city's main park there is an olympic swimming pool and a squash field.
In Tepic, tennis is a popular sport, but the most popular is football (soccer). Futsal is also commonly played in the city. The city also has a bullring, as do most Mexican cities. Tepic has several state teams, one or more for each sport. Both the football and the basketball teams are named "Coras".

Climate 
Tepic has a humid subtropical climate (Köppen climate classification Cwa), with most rain falling in the wet season from April to November, sometimes in December.

Transport
Tepic is served by Tepic International Airport, with two commercial passenger airlines flying to it.

Twin towns – sister cities
 Havana, Cuba
 Paramount, California, United States
 Caborca, Sonora, Mexico
 Compostela, Nayarit,  Mexico

See also 
 Tepic Territory

Notes

References

Sources and external links 

 Link to tables of population data from Census of 2005 INEGI: Instituto Nacional de Estadística, Geografía e Informática
  Nayarit Enciclopedia de los Municipios de México
   (Ayuntamiento de Tepic)

 
Capitals of states of Mexico

Municipalities of Nayarit
Populated places established in 1531
1531 establishments in New Spain